Petz is a 1990s series of games in which the player has virtual pets. It may also refer to:

Geography
 Schlern (also known as Petz), summit in South Tyrol
People
 Anton von Petz, Austrian-Hungarian Navy officer
 Dénes Petz, professor of mathematical physics and quantum information
 Johann Christoph Petz, German composer and Kapellmeister
 Manfred Petz, German goalkeeper
Media
 Familie Petz, Austrian television programme